Damdep-I, also known as New Jognasury-I, is a village located in the southern part of the Chakma Autonomous District Council in the Lawngtlai District of the state of Mizoram, India. The village was established in 1969 and is surrounded by hills and lush green vegetation, including a variety of bamboo plants.

Demographics
As of the 2011 India census, Tonk Khurd had a population of  spread over  households. Males constitute 49.5% of the population and females 50.5%. Damdep-I has an average literacy rate of 41.6%. 17.1% of the population is under 6 years of age.

Transport
New Jognasury is well connected by all-weather road to Lawngtlai, the district headquarters.

References

Villages in Chakma Autonomous District Council